The Namibia Red Cross Society, also known as NRCS, is a humanitarian organisation with its headquarters in Windhoek, Namibia. It was founded in 1991 by an Act of Parliament, and in 1993 was admitted as a member of the International Federation of the Red Cross and Red Crescent Societies.

References

External links
Namibia Red Cross Society profile
 Namibia Red Cross Society Website

Red Cross and Red Crescent national societies
1992 establishments in Namibia
Organizations established in 1992
Medical and health organisations based in Namibia